Johnny Mathis Sings the Great New American Songbook is a studio album by American pop singer Johnny Mathis that was released on September 29, 2017, by Columbia Records and was composed of covers of recent hits by other artists. His last project to tackle the latest radio favorites was the 1996 release Because You Loved Me: The Songs of Diane Warren.

History

Mathis sang at a pre-Grammy party hosted by Clive Davis in February 2015 and, "by almost all accounts, brought the house down and the crowd to its collective feet with his performance of his past hits." The appearance inspired the idea to have the singer make a concept album that Davis would executive produce and Kenneth "Babyface" Edmonds would produce, but instead of focusing on the Great American Songbook as Mathis has done throughout his career, the selections here date back only as far as the 1990s.

Critical reception

Allmusic's James Christopher Monger wrote, "What's best is that he sounds legitimately engaged throughout, even on the umpteenth reading of Leonard Cohen's 'Hallelujah,' and his voice, which is a bit overly treated at times (seriously, Johnny Mathis does not need Auto-Tune), is as strong as ever, making one wonder why it took so long for him to apply his still considerable gifts to more contemporary fare."

Track listing

 "Hallelujah" (Leonard Cohen) – 5:30
 "Once Before I Go" (Peter Allen, Dean Pitchford) – 3:49
 "Blue Ain't Your Color" (Steven Lee Olsen, Hillary Lindsey, Clint Lagerberg) – 3:44
 "You Raise Me Up" (Brendan Graham, Rolf Løvland) – 4:01
 "Say Something" (Ian Axel, Chad King, Mike Campbell) – 3:15
 "Just the Way You Are" (Philip Lawrence, Ari Levine, Bruno Mars, Khari Cain, Saint Cassius) – 3:27
 "I Believe I Can Fly" (R. Kelly) – 4:47
 "Remember When" (Alan Jackson) – 3:55
 "Happy" (Pharrell Williams) – 3:25
 "Hello" (Adele Adkins, Greg Kurstin) – 5:17
 "Run to You" (Allan Rich, Jud Friedman) – 4:29

Personnel

 Musicians
Johnny Mathis - vocals 
Percy Bady - choir director 
Felicia Barton – background vocals  
Paul Boutin - engineer, mixing, percussion 
Vernard Burton - choir/chorus 
Antonio Dixon - drum programming, keyboard programming, producer 
Kenneth "Babyface" Edmonds - bass, electric bass, drum programming, acoustic guitar, electric guitar, keyboard programming, producer, background vocals
Chloe Flower - piano arrangement 
Paul Franklin - pedal steel guitar 
Kenny G - soprano sax 
Eleanor Hampton - choir/chorus 
Lori Hardiman - choir/chorus 
Kenya Henry - choir/chorus 
Judith Hill – background vocals
Carya Holmes - choir/chorus 
Kimberly Holmes - choir/chorus 
Andrea Moore - choir/chorus 
Marcus Morton - choir/chorus 
Demonté Posey - drum programming, keyboard programming, organ, producer, string arrangements 
Michael Ripoll - acoustic guitar 
William Ross - string arrangements 
Aaron Shuman - string preparation 
Shawn Stockman - guest artist 
Terrance Marshall - choir/chorus 

 Production
Kenneth "Babyface" Edmonds - producer 
Mary Webster - producer, string score 
John Doelp - A&R 
Jay Landers - A&R 
Vlado Meller - mastering 
Jeff Breaky - engineer 
Fred Mollin - engineer 
Dave Salley - engineer 
Rollin Weary - assistant engineer 
Eliot Hazel - photography 
Dave Bett - art direction 
Tina Ibañez - design 
Johnny Mathis - liner notes

References

Johnny Mathis albums
Columbia Records albums
2017 albums
Covers albums